The following lists events that happened during 1953 in Laos.

Incumbents
Monarch: Sisavang Vong 
Prime Minister: Souvanna Phouma

Events

November
 November 9 - The Laotian Civil War begins between the Kingdom of Laos and the Pathet Lao after Laos gains its independence from France.

References

 
1950s in Laos
Years of the 20th century in Laos
Laos
Laos